Pointless Peak, elevation , is a mountain summit located in Inyo County of northern California, United States. Set one-half mile east of the crest of the Sierra Nevada mountain range, the peak is situated in the John Muir Wilderness on land managed by Inyo National Forest. It rises at the northern end of Little Lakes Valley, and is immediately west of Rock Creek Lake. Neighbors include Mount Starr, 2.5 miles to the south, and line parent Mount Huntington, 1.4 mile to the northwest. This landform is also known as "Mono Mesa", but neither name is official and it will remain unofficial so long as the USGS policy of not adopting new toponyms in designated wilderness areas remains in effect.

Climate
According to the Köppen climate classification system, Pointless Peak is located in an alpine climate zone. Most weather fronts originate in the Pacific Ocean, and travel east toward the Sierra Nevada mountains. As fronts approach, they are forced upward by the peaks (orographic lift), causing them to drop their moisture in the form of rain or snowfall onto the range. Precipitation runoff from the north slope of this mountain drains into Hilton Creek, and from the east side into Rock Creek.

Gallery

References

Inyo National Forest
Mountains of Inyo County, California
Mountains of the John Muir Wilderness
North American 3000 m summits
Mountains of Northern California
Sierra Nevada (United States)